Roknabad (also Romanized as Roknābād; also known as Roknābād-e Sarvestān and Rokn Abad Sarvestan) is a village in Shurjeh Rural District, in the Central District of Sarvestan County, Fars Province, Iran. At the 2006 census, its population was 327, in 62 families.

References 

Populated places in Sarvestan County